Bayano, also known as Ballano or Vaino, was an African enslaved by Spaniards who led the biggest slave revolts of 16th century Panama. Captured from the Yoruba community in West Africa, it has been argued that his name means idol. Different tales tell of their revolt in 1552 beginning either on the ship en route, or after landing in Panama's Darien province along its modern-day border with Colombia. Rebel slaves, known as cimarrones, set up autonomous regions known as palenques, many of which successfully fended off Spanish control for centuries using guerrilla war and alliances with pirates, or indigenous nations who were in similar circumstances.

King Bayano's forces numbered between four and twelve hundred Cimarrons, depending upon different sources, and set up a palenque known as Ronconcholon near modern-day Chepo River, also known as Rio Bayano. They fought their guerrilla war for over five years while building their community. However, the most important primary source, written in 1581 by Pedro de Aguado, devotes space to their religious life, and describes the activities of a "bishop" who guided the community in prayer, baptized them, and delivered sermons, in a manner that Aguado believed to be essentially Christian.  Bayano gained truces with Panama's colonial governor, Pedro de Ursúa, but Ursúa subsequently captured the guerrilla leader and sent him to Peru and then to Spain, where he died. Bayano's revolt coincided with that of King Miguel de Buría (1551/52-1553/55) and was followed by Luis de Mozambique (1579-1582) and dozens more during the following century.

Bayano's name has become immortal in the Panamanian consciousness through the naming of a major river, a lake, a valley, a dam, and several companies after him.

See also
Bayano Wars

References

Panamanian slaves
Panamanian Roman Catholics
Rebel slaves
16th-century slaves
16th-century rebels